George Powell Barnes (20 September 1856 – 9 December 1949), generally referred to by his full name or as "George P. Barnes", was a Queensland businessman and politician.

Early life
George was a son of Cobb and Co. pioneer Hiram Barnes and a brother of Walter Barnes MLA.

Business interests

George Barnes started the company Barnes and Company Limited in 1880 in association with his brother, Walter Henry Barnes and Mr TF Merry.  Merry was a storekeeper in Toowoomba, with whom George worked earlier and whose daughter, Mary Cecelia was married to George in 1879.  Barnes and Co was formed to control businesses in Warwick, Allora, Yangan and Roma Street and Commonwealth Flour Mills at Warwick and South Brisbane.

He was a leading figure in the Warwick Methodist Church and the Warwick Ambulance Brigade.

Politics
He was member for Warwick for 27 years, from 1908 to 1935, when he retired.

Family
He married Mary Cecilia Merry (ca.1858  – 3 October 1942) of Bulimba, Queensland in 1879. She was active in the local Methodist Church, Red Cross Society and Benevolent Society; they had a home "Glen Lyn" in Warwick.

A son, Franklin George Barnes (ca.1883 – ) was a mining engineer who devised and patented a method for degaussing British ships to counter the threat of magnetic mines in the early days of World War II.

Another son, Cecil Merry Barnes, lost his life savings when his company, Barnes Ltd. of Fortitude Valley was forced into liquidation. G. P. Barnes felt his son's failure acutely, and personally paid out the company's preference shareholders.

Legacy
The former Barnes and Co. Trading Place in Warwick is listed on the Queensland Heritage Register.

Notes

References 

Members of the Queensland Legislative Assembly
Australian businesspeople
1856 births
1949 deaths
National Party of Australia members of the Parliament of Queensland